Simeon is a given name, from the Hebrew  (Biblical Šimʿon, Tiberian Šimʿôn), usually transliterated as Shimon. In Greek it is written Συμεών, hence the Latinized spelling Symeon.

Meaning
The name is derived from Simeon, son of Jacob and Leah, patriarch of the Tribe of Simeon.  The text of  Genesis (29:33) argues that the name of Simeon refers to Leah's belief that God had heard that she was hated by Jacob, in the sense of not being as favoured as Rachel.

Implying a derivation from the Hebrew term shama on, meaning "he has heard"; this is a similar etymology as the Torah gives for the theophoric name Ishmael ("God has heard"; Genesis 16:11), on the basis of which it has been argued that the tribe of Simeon may originally have been an Ishmaelite group (Cheyne and Black, Encyclopaedia Biblica). Alternatively, Hitzig, W. R. Smith, Stade, and Kerber compared שִׁמְעוֹן Šīmə‘ōn to Arabic سِمع simˤ "the offspring of the hyena and the female wolf"; as supports, Smith points to Arabic tribal names Simˤ "a subdivision of the defenders (the Medinites)" and Samˤān "a subdivision of Tamim".

In classical rabbinical sources, the name is sometimes interpreted as meaning "he who listens [to the words of God]" (Genesis Rabbah 61:4), and at other times thought to derive from sham 'in, meaning "there is sin", which is argued to be a prophetic reference to Zimri's sexual miscegenation with a Midianite woman, a type of relationship which rabbinical sources regard as sinful (Jewish Encyclopedia).

In the Bible
Simeon (son of Jacob), in the Hebrew Bible
Tribe of Simeon, one of the twelve tribes of Israel
Simeon the Just (3rd century BC?) a Jewish High Priest, also called "Simeon the Righteous" (not the same as the New Testament figure, below)
Simeon (Gospel of Luke), figure in the New Testament who blessed Jesus and his parents in the Jerusalem temple
Simeon Niger, person in the Book of Acts

Persons with the given name

Up to 1700 AD
Ordered chronologically.
Simeon of Jerusalem (15–14 BC–c. 107 or 117), 2nd Bishop of Jerusalem, perhaps one of the Seventy Apostles sent out by Jesus
Simeon ben Gamliel, Nasi of the Sanhedrin in 50 AD
Simeon ben Gamliel II, Nasi of the Sanhedrin in c. 118 AD
Simeon Bar Kokhba, leader of the Bar Kokhba revolt
Simeon bar Yochai, rabbi of the Tannaim period, possibly the author of the Zohar
Simeon Stylites (c. 388–459 AD), Christian pillar-hermit from Sisan, Syria
Simeon Stylites III, 5th-century pillar-hermit
Simeon Stylites the Younger (521–597 AD), hermit and pillar-hermit from Antioch
Simeon, the name of one priest and one deacon martyred with Abda and Abdjesus
Simeon the Holy Fool, 6th-century Christian saint and hermit
Simeon I of Bulgaria (866–927), Bulgarian tsar
Symeon Metaphrastes (10th century?), Byzantine hagiographer
Symeon the New Theologian (949–1022), Eastern Orthodox saint
Simeon (abbot) (994–1094), Abbot of Ely Cathedral
Simeon Seth (fl. 1070), Jewish Byzantine physician, writer, and grand chamberlain from Antioch
Simeon of Mantua (died 1016), Armenian monk
Symeon of Durham (died after 1129), English chronicler and monk of Durham Priory
Stefan Nemanja (1113–1199), canonized as Saint Simeon, Serbian ruler and saint of the Serbian Orthodox Church
Simeon of Moscow, 14th-century Grand Prince of Moscow
Simeon Uroš, 14th-century ruler of Epirus and Thessaly
Simon of Trent, 15th-century boy supposedly killed by Jews, and formerly a martyr of the Catholic Church
Patriarch Symeon I of Constantinople, or Symeon of Trebizond, reigned three times: 1466, 1471–1475 and 1482–1486
Simeon Bekbulatovich, de jure Tsar of Russia (1575–1576)
Symeon of Polotsk (1629–1680), Russian poet, dramatist, churchman, and enlightener

Since 1700 AD
Ordered alphabetically by last name.
Semyon Belits-Geiman (born 1945), former Soviet Olympic freestyle swimmer
Semyon Budyonny (1883–1973), Soviet military commander
Simeon Coxe (usually known only as Simeon), American musician, singer and synth player of Silver Apples
Simeon Jocelyn (1799-1879), minister and abolitionist
Simeon Mangiuca (1831–1890), Austro-Hungarian Romanian folklorist
Simeon V. Marcelo (born 1953), Filipino lawyer and former Ombudsman and Solicitor-General of the Philippines
Simeon North (1765–1852), American gunmaker
Siméon Denis Poisson (1781–1840), French mathematician
Simeon Rice (born 1974), American football player
Simeon Woods Richardson (born 2000), American professional baseball player
Simeon Saxe-Coburg-Gotha (born 1937), Tsar of Bulgaria (1943–1946), prime minister of Bulgaria (2001–2005)
Semyon Sereda (1871–1933), Soviet politician
Simeon Thomas (born 1993), American football player
Simeon Tienpont (born 1982), Dutch sailor
Semyon Varlamov (born 1988), Russian ice hockey player
Simeon S. Willis (1879–1965), American lawyer, judge, and politician from Kentucky

See also
Shimun (disambiguation), also Shemon
Simeon (surname)
Simon (disambiguation) 
Simone (disambiguation)
Chamoun, also Shimun

References

Russian masculine given names
Serbian masculine given names
Bulgarian masculine given names
Hebrew masculine given names